"Free Me" is a song written by Russ Ballard and performed by Roger Daltrey, singer for English rock band The Who. The song is on Daltrey's 1980 solo album McVicar and in the film McVicar, also released in 1980.

Recorded
"Free Me" was on his album McVicar. The song was written for the soundtrack of the film McVicar, a bio-pic of English bank robber John McVicar, that was produced by Daltrey and also featured him in the starring role.

The single was produced by Jeff Wayne and recorded at Advision Studios, London with Daltrey's vocals recorded at Air Studios, Montserrat, West Indies.

Charts
The single reached #39 in the UK Singles Chart and #53 in the US.

References

1980 songs
1980 singles
Songs written by Russ Ballard
Polydor Records singles
Song recordings produced by Jeff Wayne